Santa María Yosoyúa is a town and municipality in Oaxaca in south-western Mexico. It is part of the Tlaxiaco District in the south of the Mixteca Region.

References

Municipalities of Oaxaca